Strepsiduridae is a taxonomic family of predatory sea snails, marine gastropod mollusks in the superfamily Muricoidea, but its position is doubtful.

According to the taxonomy of the Gastropoda by Bouchet & Rocroi (2005) the family Strepsiduridae has no subfamilies.

Genera 
Genera within the family Strepsiduridae include:
 Strepsidura Swainson, 1840
 The type species of the genus Strepsidura is fossil.
 † Strepsidura ficus (Gabb)
 † Strepsidura harrisi Givens & Garvie, 1994
 †Strepsidura turgida (Solander, 1766)
 Melapium H. Adams & A. Adams, 1853
 Melapium elatum (Schubert & Wagner, 1829)
 Melapium lineatum (Lamarck, 1822)

References

External links 

 Photos of shells of Melapium elatum and Melapium lineatum